The Glina-Schneckenberg culture was an Early Bronze Age archaeological culture located in Romania, dating from c. 2600 BC to 2000 BC. It was preceded by the Coțofeni culture and succeeded by the Monteoru culture and Tei culture.

See also
Helladic Greece
Bell Beaker culture
Unetice culture

References

Archaeological cultures of Central Europe
Archaeological cultures of Eastern Europe
Bronze Age cultures of Europe
Archaeological cultures in Romania